NGC 804 is a lenticular galaxy located in the Triangulum constellation about 231 million light-years from the Milky Way. It was discovered by the American astronomer Lewis Swift in 1885. This galaxy was also observed by the French astronomer Guillaume Bigourdan on December 24, 1897, and it has been added to the  Index Catalogue under the symbol IC 1773.

See also 
 List of NGC objects (1–1000)

References

External links 
 

0804
IC objects
Triangulum (constellation)
Lenticular galaxies
007873